The Hrvatska nogometna liga, also known as HNL or for sponsorship reasons the SuperSport HNL, is the top Croatian professional football league competition, established in 1992. Previously, it was called Prva Hrvatska nogometna liga (First Croatian Football League), but a league structure reorganization from 2022–23 led to name changes for the three top league levels.

Overview
The league was formed in 1991, following the dissolution of the Yugoslav First League, and is operated by the Croatian Football Federation. Since its formation, the league went through many changes in its system and number of participating clubs. In the first three seasons two points were awarded for a win, from 1994–95 season this was changed to three points. Each season starts in late July or early August and ends in May, with a two-month hiatus between December and February. Currently, there are ten teams participating in the league.

The first season started in February 1992 and ended in June 1992. A total of twelve clubs contested the league and at the end of the season no teams were relegated as it was decided that the league would expand to 16 clubs for the following season. This was followed by another expansion to 18 teams in 1993–94 season, highest number of participating teams in Prva HNL history. The following season, number of teams was reduced again to 16. 1995–96 Prva HNL was the first season to feature separate A- and B- leagues, with a complicated two-stage format to the season. Twelve teams contested the A league, while the B league, formally the second level, consisted of ten teams. In March, the teams were split into three groups: Championship group (consisting of first five teams from A league and the first-placed team of the B league), A play-off group (remaining teams from A league and the second-placed team of the B league) and B play-off group (remaining teams from B league). The first two teams of the B play-off group were placed in the A league for the following season, which featured 16 teams in both A and B league. In the 1997–98 Prva HNL, the league consisted of 12 team and a new format was used. In March, teams were split into two groups of six, Championship and Relegation group, with 50% of their points taken to this phase of the competition. At the end of the season, the last team was directly relegated to the Druga HNL and the second-last team went in the relegation play-off, a two-legged tie against the second-placed team from the Druga HNL. This system was used for two seasons, followed by 1999–2000 Prva HNL where each club playing every other club three times for a total of 33 rounds. Next season featured a return of Championship and Relegation group system but without 50% points cutoff. This system was used until 2005–06 season, with a brief expansion to 16 teams in 2001–02 season. The 2006–07 season brought back a 33 rounds system previously used in 1999–2000 Prva HNL. In the 2009–10 season, the league was expanded to 16 teams. This lasted for three seasons, and in the 2012–13 Prva HNL season, the league was contested by 12 teams playing a total of 33 rounds. From the 2013–14 Prva HNL season, number of teams was reduced to ten.

The league's main sponsor is T-Hrvatski Telekom, owned by the German telecommunications firm Deutsche Telekom. At the end of the 2014–15 season, the Croatian First League was ranked 17th in Europe. The champions of the 2015–16 Croatian First Football League will qualify for the second qualifying round of the UEFA Champions League, the runners-up will qualify for the second qualifying round of UEFA Europa League, while the third-placed team will qualify for the first qualifying round of UEFA Europa League. The winners of the 2015–16 Croatian Football Cup will qualify for the third qualifying round of UEFA Europa League.

Clubs
The following ten clubs compete in the 2022–23 Croatian Football League season, the 32nd season since the league's establishment.

Five of the ten clubs currently competing in the Croatian top level also had spells in the Yugoslav First League played from 1945 to 1991 before Croatian clubs abandoned the competition (Dinamo Zagreb, Hajduk Split, Lokomotiva, Osijek, Rijeka). Four other Croatian clubs which had appeared in the top Yugoslav league (Cibalia, RNK Split, NK Zagreb and Trešnjevka) are currently playing in Croatian lower levels.

As of 2022, only four of the 12 founding members of the Croatian league have never been relegated: Dinamo Zagreb, Hajduk Split, Osijek and Rijeka.

† – One of the 12 founding members of the league in the inaugural 1992 season.
‡ – Appeared in all 31 seasons up to and including the current 2021–22 season.
nb1 – Dinamo Zagreb tally includes four Yugoslav and 22 Croatian league titles.
nb2 – Hajduk Split tally includes nine Yugoslav and six Croatian league titles.

Prva HNL teams in European competitions

The breakup of Yugoslavia saw top flight league split into several smaller ones. This meant separation of Croatian football association from the Football Association of Yugoslavia and launch of their own football league. Prva HNL saw its first edition in 1992. Hajduk Split and HAŠK Građanski took part in European competitions on account of qualification secured at the end of the 1990–91 Yugoslav football season: HAŠK Građanski were runners-up in the 1990–91 Yugoslav First League and qualified for 1991–92 UEFA Cup while Hajduk Split won the 1990–91 Yugoslav Cup and entered 1991–92 European Cup Winners' Cup. Due to war both clubs had to host their European matches abroad, in Austria.

Affected by the ongoing war in Croatia, the first Prva HNL season was held over the course of a single calendar year, from February to June 1992. Neither Hajduk Split (1992 Croatian champions) nor Inker Zaprešić (1992 Croatian Cup winners) could enter European competitions the following 1992–93 season as the Croatian Football Federation, the league's governing body, wasn't yet recognized by UEFA and officially became its affiliate as late as June 1993.

Eight times in history have HNL teams entered the group stages of UEFA Champions League. In the 1994–95 season, Hajduk Split eliminated Legia Warsaw in the qualifying round and entered the group stage. They advanced to quarterfinals as group runners-up behind Benfica but were eliminated by eventual winners Ajax. In the 1998–99 season, Croatia Zagreb qualified over Celtic and finished in second place behind Olympiacos, but failed to advance as only first place teams and two best runners-up went through. The following season, Croatia also entered the group stage after eliminating MTK Budapest in the third qualifying round. Drawn in the group with Manchester United, Olympique Marseille and Sturm Graz, they finished last, winning only against Sturm and drawing away at Manchester and Marseille. In the 2011–12 season, Dinamo Zagreb advanced through three qualifying rounds and were drawn in the group with Real Madrid, Lyon and Ajax. The following season, Dinamo Zagreb also advanced to the group stages and was drawn in the group with Dynamo Kyiv, Paris Saint-Germain and Porto. They lost five group matches, drawing with Dynamo Kyiv in the last round. In the 2015-16 season, Dinamo Zagreb entered the group stage and recorded notable win 2–1 over Arsenal. Next season, 2016-17, another qualification followed. Latest entry to the group stage was in 2019-20 where Dinamo Zagreb finished fourth behind Manchester City, Atalanta and Shakhtar with 2 draws vs Shakhtar and a 4–0 win over Atlanta, with controversial refereeing decisions in both draws — a win in either would have sent them through to the Round of 16 as runners-up.

Former names
Since 2003, the league has been named after its main sponsor, giving it the following names (Logos see below):
 2003–2007 – Prva HNL Ožujsko (Sponsored by Zagrebačka pivovara and their Ožujsko beer brand.)
 2007–2011 – T-Com Prva HNL (Sponsored by T-Hrvatski Telekom, a subsidiary of Deutsche Telekom.)
 2011–2017 – MAXtv Prva liga (Sponsored by T-Hrvatski Telekom, a subsidiary of Deutsche Telekom.)
 2017–2022 – Hrvatski Telekom Prva liga / HT Prva liga (Sponsored by T-Hrvatski Telekom, a subsidiary of Deutsche Telekom.)
 2022–present – SuperSport Hrvatska nogometna liga / SuperSport HNL (Sponsored by bookmaker SuperSport)

UEFA rankings
Europe's top football body, the UEFA, ranks national leagues every year according to coefficients calculated based on each nation's clubs results in international competitions. The ranking takes into account results over the previous five seasons to determine the nation's European quota for the following season, i.e. how many berths in European competitions is assigned to clubs from each of UEFA's 55 member associations.

UEFA also maintains a separate club ranking, based on each club's international results, used to determine seeds in draws for the UEFA Champions League and UEFA Europa League. This is calculated through a combination of each club's results as well as the ranking of its national league. As of 2022 Dinamo Zagreb is the top rated Croatian club, ranked 34th in Europe.

Country
As of 21 June 2022

Source: Bert Kassies' website (country rankings); last updated 29 May 2022

Club
As of 21 June 2022 

Source: Bert Kassies' website (team rankings); last updated 29 May 2022

Media coverage
In past, only one match in each round (derby match) was broadcast on television. In the 2008–09 season there were some changes. Croatian national TV Network (HRT) started the new TV show Volim Nogomet (I Love Football), made in association with league's main sponsor T-Com. In the show, five matches were broadcast combined on Sunday afternoons, while the derby match was on program at 20:15 CET, so viewers could watch all the matches. There were also experts in the studio, commenting on matches and other things non-related to football. Main initiator of the project was famous Croatian football player and then president of T-Com 1. HNL organisation Igor Štimac. Most of the clubs weren't satisfied with the scheduling of fixtures and demanded a move from Sunday afternoon to Saturday evening. This was done at the start of the following season and the only match played on Sunday was the derby match. However, during the mid-season project was cancelled and the old system with one broadcast per round was returned.

In November 2010, broadcasting rights were sold to marketing agency Digitel Komunikacije for a period of five years, beginning with 2011–12 season. After the negotiations fell through with public broadcasting television HRT, which covered Prva HNL for the past twenty seasons, Digitel signed a deal with Hrvatski Telekom. The matches were broadcast on Arenasport, a cable television network with five channels, available to subscribers of MAXtv, IPTV solution from T-HT subsidiary T-Com. All matches were broadcast live every week on Arenasport. All highlights are displayed on Sunday evening on RTL 2 and HRT 2.

From 2022–23 season the matches are broadcasting on the Hrvatski Telekom channels MAX Sport, while the one match per round will be broadcast on the Croatian Radiotelevision (HRT), again after 11 years (from September 2022, mainly on Sunday at 15:00 CET). For the other Ex-Yugoslav republics the league will still be broadcast on Arena Sport.

Attendance

Champions
Key

Notes on name changes:
Dinamo Zagreb changed their name to "HAŠK Građanski" in June 1991 and then again in February 1993 to "Croatia Zagreb". They won five league titles and participated in the 1998–99 and 1999–2000 UEFA Champions League group stages carrying that name before reverting to "Dinamo Zagreb" mid-season in February 2000.
Koprivnica-based Slaven Belupo were formerly known as "Slaven" until 1992. They were then known as "Slaven Bilokalnik" from 1992 to 1994 before adopting their current name in 1994 for sponsorship reasons, after a pharmaceutical company based in Koprivnica. Since UEFA does not recognize sponsored club names, the club is listed as "Slaven Koprivnica" in European competitions and on UEFA's official website.

Performance by club

All-time HNL table

Top scorers
Players in the Prva HNL compete for the Prva HNL Top scorer trophy, awarded to the top scorer at the end of each season. Former Dinamo Zagreb striker Igor Cvitanović held the record for most Prva HNL goals with 126 until April 2012. Cvitanović finished among the top ten goal scorers in 7 out of his 11 seasons in the Prva HNL and won the top scorer title two times. During the 1997–98 season, he became the first player to score 100 Prva HNL goals. On 14 April 2012, Davor Vugrinec scored his 127th goal and surpassed Cvitanović's record. Vugrinec retired in May 2015 with 146 goals on his tally. Only three other players have reached the 100-goal mark, Ivan Krstanović, Joško Popović and Miljenko Mumlek.

Since the first Prva HNL season in 1992, 26 different players have won the top scorers title. Goran Vlaović, Robert Špehar, Igor Cvitanović, Tomislav Šokota and Ivica Olić have won two titles each. Dinamo Zagreb provided most top scorers in Prva HNL with 13. Eduardo holds the record for most goals in a season with 34, done with Dinamo Zagreb in the 2006–07 season. Six goals is the record individual scoring total for a player in a single Prva HNL match, held by Marijo Dodik.

Dinamo Zagreb became the first team to have scored 1,000 goals in the league after Etto scored in a 4–0 victory over NK Zagreb in the 2005–06 season. The highest-scoring match to date in the Prva HNL occurred on 12 December 1993 when Dinamo Zagreb defeated minnows NK Pazinka 10–1.

All-time top scorers in the HNL

Most appearances in HNL

Awards
There are three awards for best players in the Croatian First League:
Sportske novosti Yellow Shirt award, for the HNL footballer of the year, given by the Croatian sport newspaper Sportske novosti, chosen by sport journalists.
Prva HNL Player of the Year (Tportal), given by the Croatian website Tportal, chosen by captains of league clubs.
Football Oscar, given by the Croatian union Football syndicate, chosen by players and managers of league clubs.

See also 

 Sport in Croatia

References

External links 
 
Division 1 - Prva HNL - Presentation  — All-time table for 10 most successful clubs and all results since 1991 with links to entire results and winners, second and third.
League321.com - Croatian football league tables, records & statistics database. 
Croatia - List of Champions, RSSSF.com

 
Sports leagues established in 1992
1992 establishments in Croatia
Top level football leagues in Europe
1
Professional sports leagues in Croatia